FunTech is a British company founded in 1996 which offers extracurricular computer tuition for children aged 5 to 18 years old based in Maidenhead, Berkshire.

Courses generally consist of weekly classes of 6 to 10 students as well as online homework, however one-on-one tuition and holiday courses are also available. Subjects range from the basics of computer use and touch typing, through to GCSE, A-Level and Computer Programming. Classes are normally carried out at the company's Maidenhead centre, although courses have been hosted at other schools.

FunTech has been featured on both the BBC as part of the Tomorrow's World Technology Family series and Channel 4 as part of a report on the British Government's decision to provide broadband access for every child

Every summer since 2013, FunTech hosts summer camp offerings to children in many English cities including Maidenhead, Oxford and Richmond. Courses include Touch Typing, several Minecraft courses, Python and Java programming and 3D game design. The preliminary summer session concluded successfully with well over 250 students attending over 6 weeks.

Since the beginning of the Covid lock-down, they have been offering a range of virtual courses, in which students are able to learn the necessary skills of computing and further their knowledge in coding and designing which many parents and students have highly reviewed.

Notes

External links 
 FunTech website
 FunTech FAQs

Companies based in Maidenhead
Education companies established in 1996